Dipsas praeornata  is a non-venomous snake found in Venezuela.

References

Dipsas
Snakes of South America
Endemic fauna of Venezuela
Reptiles of Venezuela
Reptiles described in 1909
Taxa named by Franz Werner